Express.Net Airlines was a cargo airline based in Naples, Florida, USA. It operated all-cargo charter and ACMI services in the USA and to Canada, Mexico, South America and the Far East. Its main base is Naples Municipal Airport.

History 

The airline was established in 1972 as Trans Continental Airlines and in 1999 was purchased from Scott Kalitta by David Clark and Michael Goldberg who wholly own the airline, which had 270 employees (at March 2007).

The airline has not been in operation since 2008.

Destinations 

Express.Net Airlines operated freight services to the following international scheduled destinations (at January 2005): Palerimo, Hong Kong, Shanghai, Taipei and Tokyo.

Fleet 

The Express.Net Airlines fleet consisted of the following aircraft (at March 2007): 
9 Airbus A300B4-200F
1 Boeing 727-100F
5 Boeing 727-200F

Previously operated
At August 2009 the airline also operated:
5 DC-8
2 Boeing 727-200
2 Boeing 727-200F

See also 
 List of defunct airlines of the United States

References

External links
Express.Net Airlines

Defunct airlines of the United States
Airlines established in 1972
Airlines disestablished in 2008
Airlines based in Florida
Defunct cargo airlines
Cargo airlines of the United States